Luai may refer to:
 Luai, Iran, a village
 Luay, a given name